His Majesty's Land Registry is a non-ministerial department of His Majesty's Government, created in 1862 to register the ownership of land and property in England and Wales. It reports to the Department for Business, Energy and Industrial Strategy.

HM Land Registry is internally independent and receives no government funding; it charges fees for applications lodged by customers. The current Chief Land Registrar (and CEO) is Simon Hayes. 

The equivalent office in Scotland is the Registers of Scotland. Land and Property Services maintain records for Northern Ireland.

Purpose

HM Land Registry registers the ownership of property. It is one of the largest property databases in Europe. At the peak of the property boom in 2007, £1 million worth of property was processed every minute in England and Wales.

Like land registration organisations in other countries, HM Land Registry guarantees title to registered estates and interests in land. It records the ownership rights of freehold properties, and leasehold properties where the lease has been granted for a term exceeding seven years.

The definition of land can include the buildings situated upon the land, particularly where parts of buildings at different levels (such as flats) are in different ownership. It is also possible to register the ownership of the mines and minerals which lie within the ground, as well as airspace above property where this is in separate ownership.

Until April 2020, HM Land Registry received no government funding, being required to ensure that its income covers expenditure, and finances itself from registration and search fees. As of April 2020, HM Land Registry receives a budget from HM Treasury which is offset by the fees the Land Registry charges. This change was the result of HM Land Registry's trading fund being revoked. It provides online access to its database of titles (ownership and charges or interests by other parties) and most plans (maps). People need to pay a fee to access some information.

Property owners whose property is not registered can make voluntary applications for registration. As of March 2016, there are 24.5 million registered titles representing 88% of the land mass of England and Wales. Registration of land under the Land Registration Act 2002 affords property owners some protection against squatters as well as avoiding the need to produce old documents each time a property changes hands.

Benefits of land registration
According to HM Land Registry:

Registering a title provides a "Title Plan" which is normally not definitive, but which identifies the land within the title on the Ordnance Survey map. It is important that the original title deeds are retained as they will provide a starting point if ever it is necessary to identify the precise position of the boundaries.

In addition to being the government body that registers the ownership of land and property in England and Wales, HM Land Registry is also a useful tool for property investors who use the online price calculator to query the latest monthly residential property prices. The government is also using the land registry data to assess property values for tax purposes.

Offices
HM Land Registry has 14 offices at: Birkenhead, Coventry, Croydon, Durham, Fylde (Warton), Gloucester, Kingston upon Hull, Leicester, Nottingham, Peterborough, Plymouth, Swansea, Telford and Weymouth.

HM Land Registry's Head Office is based in Croydon. The in-house IT department (Information Systems) and Land Charges Departments are based in Plymouth.

In 2006, as a result of a review of office accommodation, HM Land Registry announced the closure of several offices. This involved merging offices in Birkenhead, Durham, Lytham/Warton, Nottingham and Swansea, and closing of offices in Harrow and York.

A further review of staffing levels and overall office space began in 2009. The economic recession and lower volumes of property sales and mortgages meant that HM Land Registry's basic work in connection with remortgages and house sales reduced to the point where it made a financial loss for the first time in many years. HM Land Registry announced proposals to close five offices at Portsmouth, Tunbridge Wells, Croydon, Stevenage and Peterborough.

As a result of consultation, the plans to close the Croydon and Peterborough offices were not carried out, but the closure of the other three went ahead, although until 2013 a small office remained at Portsmouth as a sub-office of Croydon.

The Head Office moved out of its famous Lincoln's Inn Fields building in March 2011 and is now based in Croydon. The building has been purchased by the London School of Economics for a sum of £37.5 million. During the early part of 2011, staff based in the Plymouth office were relocated to the Information Systems office in Seaton Court.

Structure 
Each local office has an area manager (sometimes shared between offices), a local land registrar (also sometimes shared between offices) who is the senior lawyer, an operations manager, and an integrity manager. Each office also has staff responsible for processing applications lodged by members of the legal profession and the public.

Traditionally customers send applications to the office that deals with applications for the geographical area where the property is located, but since 2009 many customers now deal with dedicated customer teams, who deal with all their applications from certain customers regardless of where the property is located. From 6 January 2014, all paper applications lodged by members of the public have been processed at the Citizen Centre at Land Registry Wales Office.

The organisation is led by the Chief Land Registrar and Chief Executive (both one role). The Chief Land Registrar is assisted by the HM Land Registry Board and executive board. The HM Land Registry Board sets the overall strategy for the department. The executive board delivers the annual business plan and is responsible for day-to-day management.

Since December 1990, the Land Register has been open to the public. For a fee, anyone can inspect the register, find out the name and address of the current owner of any registered property or obtain a copy of any registered title. This can also be done online.

HM Land Registry was awarded the former Charter Mark five times, and 97% of its customers rate their service as good, very good or excellent.

HM Land Registry has an independent complaints reviewer.

Adjudicator to the Land Registry
Disputed applications to Land Registry were determined by the Adjudicator to HM Land Registry, an independent office created by the Land Registration Act 2002. Under previous legislation this function had been the responsibility of the Chief Land Registrar.

From July 2013, the functions of the Adjudicator have been transferred to the Land Registration division of the Property Chamber of the First-tier Tribunal.

History

In 1857 the Royal Commission on Registration of Title proposed a system of registration administered by a central registry in London with district offices. The Land Registry Act 1862 was introduced by the then Lord Chancellor, Richard Bethell, 1st Baron Westbury. The Act provided for the registration of freehold and long leasehold estates in land. The system of registration adopted had some differences to that piloted in South Australia by that colony's then Premier Sir Robert Torrens, although both were founded on the 1857 report.

Brent Spencer Follett, the first Chief Land Registrar, opened the Land Registry's first offices, at 34 Lincoln's Inn Fields, London, on 15 October 1862. Mr Follett had a staff of just six people and was paid £2,500 a year, at a time when the average labourer's wage was £40.

At first, registration was not compulsory, and once property was registered there was no compulsion to register any subsequent transactions. Thus it was possible for the person registered as the owner of a property to cease to be the owner while remaining on the register. Serious flaws in the 1862 Act led to the Land Transfer Act 1875, which forms the basis of the system used today. However, the LTA did not make registration compulsory.

A report by Sir Charles Brickdale on the system of land registration used in Germany proved influential. In 1897 the then Lord Chancellor, Hardinge Giffard, 1st Earl of Halsbury introduced the Land Transfer Act 1897, which brought an element of compulsion into the registration system. To satisfy the demands of the legal profession, the option of a county veto was offered.

London County Council was attracted to the idea of compulsory registration and voted in favour of it. It was introduced in stages between 1899 and 1902 and this led to the expansion of HM Land Registry. Also at this time, the first female staff were employed and typewriters were introduced. A proposal to extend compulsory registration to Northamptonshire in 1902 was lost in committee.

From 1905 to 1913 new HM Land Registry headquarters were built in Lincoln's Inn Fields.

Two significant pieces of land legislation were enacted in 1925: the Law of Property Act and the Land Registration Act. Government-initiated extensions to compulsory registration were suspended for ten years, but Eastbourne (1926) and Hastings (1929) voluntarily became areas of compulsory registration. After the ten years were up, compulsory registration was extended to Middlesex (1937) and the County Borough of Croydon (1939). Plans to extend it to Surrey in 1940 were abandoned due to the Second World War. In 1925 the government forecast that the whole of England and Wales would be subject to compulsory registration by 1955, but the process took much longer.

In 1940, after damage sustained in the 193rd air raid on Central London, HM Land Registry was evacuated to the Marsham Court Hotel in Bournemouth so that it could carry on its normal business. In 1950, 88 years after its creation, HM Land Registry registered its one millionth title.

The growth in property ownership after the war years meant that the potential number of properties to be registered increased dramatically. This, in turn, slowed down the rate of land registration. To deal with the increasing workload, an office was opened in Tunbridge Wells in 1955 and a further office at Lytham St. Annes in 1957. In 1963, 101 years after the registry started, it registered its two millionth title.

Theodore Ruoff, who was appointed Chief Land Registrar in 1963, confirmed the three fundamental principles of Land Registration that were laid down in the LRA 1925.

 The mirror principle — the register of title should reflect, accurately and completely, and beyond all argument, the facts that are material to the title
 The curtain principle — the register should be the sole and definitive source of information for proposing purchasers, but should not reveal sensitive information
 The insurance principle — if, as a result of human error, the title is proved to be defective in any way, then the person or persons suffering loss as a result, must be able to claim compensation

New offices were opened in Gloucester and Stevenage (1964), Durham and Harrow (1965), Plymouth (1966), Croydon and Swansea (1967), Birkenhead and Weymouth (1977), Peterborough (1978), Telford (1986), Coventry and Hull (1987), Leicester (1988), Portsmouth (1989), York (1991) and Lancashire (2000).

Land registers at this time were not public records, and processing them required laborious typing and the completion of plans by hand using paintbrushes and ink on linen. Copies of everything produced had to be made by hand. HM Land Registry retained the originals, and the copies were sewn, using needle and thread, into large certificates. The certificates were produced as indisputable evidence of the ownership of the land. Such was the importance of the certificates that tampering with them was a criminal offence.

In 1986 the Plymouth Office became the first HM Land Registry office to produce registers electronically. Although the certificates still bore the same importance, computerisation dramatically increased the efficiency of the Land Register at a time when HM Land Registry was keen to bring the whole of England and Wales under compulsory registration.

In 1990 the provision of compulsory registration was brought to the whole of England and Wales, the ten millionth title was registered, and for the first time, the Land Register was opened to public inspection.

Although compulsory registration had now spread to the whole of its jurisdiction, compulsion only occurred when a property was sold. This was a barrier to the registration of the whole of England and Wales, and in 1998 new triggers for registration were introduced, dramatically increasing the rate of registration of land. These triggers included gifts of land, assent of land on death and raising monies by mortgages on the land.

The Land Registration Act 2002 leaves the system substantially in place, but enables the future compulsory introduction of electronic conveyancing, using electronic signatures to transfer and register property.  As a result of that act, Land and Charge Certificates are no longer issued.

The new home of the Information Systems department, a state-of-the-art office with 500 staff, was opened in 2005 in Plymouth's International Business Park.

Chief Land Registrars
 Brent Spencer Follett (1862–1886)
 Robert Hallet Holt (1886–1900)
 Sir Charles Fortescue Brickdale (1900–1923)
 Sir John Stewart Stewart-Wallace (1923–1941)
 Rouxville Mark Lowe (1941–1947)
 Sir George Harold Curtis (1947–1963)
 Theodore Burton Fox Ruoff (1963–1974)
 Robert Burnell Roper (1974–1983)
 Eric John Pryer (1983–1990)
 John Manthorpe (1990–1996)
 Stuart John Hill (1996–1999)
 Peter Collis (1999–2010)
 Marco Pierleoni (2010–2011)
 Malcolm Dawson (2011–2013)
 Ed Lester (2013–2015)
 Graham Farrant (2015–2018)
 Mike Harlow (Acting) (2018–2019)
 Simon Hayes (2019–)

Privatisation plans
On 23 January 2014, the Government issued a public consultation on its proposal to create a service delivery company to carry out the day-to-day process of land registration. This might be either a wholly Government-owned company or privately owned, and was to be subject to regulation from the Office of the Chief Land Registrar, which would remain part of Government. This proposal generated considerable controversy in the media and was opposed by Land Registry staff. There was also opposition to the plans from legal professionals and other users of Land Registry services. In July 2014, the Government announced that, having considered the results of the consultation, whilst it continued to consider that there were considerable benefits to a service delivery company, it felt that further consideration was necessary and therefore would not be proceeding with any changes.

In November 2015, it was reported that the Chancellor of the Exchequer was reconsidering privatising the agency and an article in PoliticsHome noted that all potential bidders were linked to tax havens.

The privatization plans have faced fierce opposition from the industry in 2016. The Conveyancing Association has argued that a ‘reversal of the recent halving of fees’ could in fact double Land Registry's income ‘yet is a relatively small burden for the homebuyer in amongst the other costs and charges involved in the process’ of privatisation’. The Competition & Markets Authority (CMA) has claimed that the privatisation would give a private organisation monopoly to commercially valuable data and provide little inclination to improve anyone's access to it. Currently the Land Registry makes some datasets available for purchase by private companies and other organisations, such as Search Providers. Private search companies and ordering platforms have been integrating Land Registry's data to improve search ordering for conveyancers. Data from Land Registry's National Spatial Dataset, for example, has been used to display boundary maps on-screen using a live data link to help conveyancers validate property locations.

The government made further proposals to privatise the Land Registry in a consultation which ran from 24 March to 26 May 2016.

In the 2016 Autumn Statement, Chancellor Philip Hammond put an end to speculation about Land Registry privatisation:

See also
 Geospatial Commission
 Rural Land Register
 National Land and Property Gazetteer
 Housing in the United Kingdom
 Torrens system

Bibliography

 Ch.26 for current law in England and Wales

References

External links

 Land Registry website
 Registers of Scotland website

Department for Business, Innovation and Skills
English property law
Housing in the United Kingdom
Executive agencies of the United Kingdom government
Trading funds of the United Kingdom government
Government databases in the United Kingdom
Databases in England
Databases in Wales
1862 establishments in England
Geographical databases in the United Kingdom
Geographic data and information organisations in the United Kingdom
Land registration